Pavlović (Serbo-Croatian) or Pavlovič (in Slovenian and Slovak) is a surname of South Slavic origin stemming from the male given name Pavao, Pavle or Pavel, which are all Slavic variants of Paul. It was formed using the patronymic suffix -ović, meaning son of Pavao/Pavle/Pavel.

Pavlović is the ninth most frequent surname in Serbia. It is among the most frequent surnames in three Croatian counties.

It may refer to:

 Pavlović noble family, served the Kingdom of Bosnia (1391-1463)

 Aleksandar Pavlović (born 1983), Serbian basketball player
 Ante Pavlović, Croatian footballer
 Bernardin Pavlović, Croatian 18th century Franciscan writer
 Bojan Pavlović (footballer born 1986), Serbian football goalkeeper
 Bojan Pavlović (footballer born 1985), Serbian football midfielder
 Branko Pavlović (born 1960), Serbian politician and lawyer
 Daniel Pavlović (born 1988), Bosnian footballer
 Danijel Pavlović (born 1985), Serbian television personality
 Dušan Pavlović (professor) (born 1969), Serbian political economist and politician
 Dušan Pavlović (footballer) (born 1977), Serb-Swiss footballer
 Igor Pavlović (footballer born 1982), Serbian footballer
 Igor Pavlović (footballer born 1986), Serbian footballer
 Irena Pavlovic (born 1988), French tennis player
 Koča Pavlović (born 1962), Montenegrin filmmaker and politician
 Ladislav Pavlovič (born 1926), Slovak retired footballer
 Lara Pavlović, Croatian handballer
 Laura Pavlovic, Serbian opera singer
 Marko Pavlović (born 1982), Serbian footballer
 Milan Pavlović (footballer) (born 1970), Serbian footballer
 Milan Pavlović (actor) (born 1970), Bosnian actor and TV personality
 Milan Pavlovič (born 1980), Slovak footballer
 Milena Pavlović-Barili (1909–1945), Serbian painter and poet
 Milica Pavlović (born 1991), Serbian pop-folk singer
 Miloš Pavlović (footballer) (born 1983), Serbian footballer
 Miloš Pavlović (racing driver) (born 1982), Serbian race car driver
 Miodrag Pavlović (born 1928), Serbian poet
 Mirjan Pavlović (born 1989), Australian footballer
 Miroslav Pavlović (1942–2004), Serbian footballer
 Nataša Pavlović, Serbian-American mathematician
 Nebojša Pavlović (born 1981), Serbian footballer
 Nemanja Pavlović (born 1977), Serbian footballer
 Predrag Pavlović (born 1986), Serbian footballer
 Siraba Dembélé Pavlović (born 1986), French handballer
 Steve Pavlovic (born 1967), Australian music promoter
 Vladan Pavlović (born 1984), Serbian football player
 Željko Pavlović (born 1971), Croatian football goalkeeper
 Živojin Pavlović (1933–1998), Serbian film director and writer
 Zlatoje Pavlović (born 1995), Serbian footballer
 Zoran Pavlovič (born 1976), Slovenian footballer

References

Serbian surnames
Croatian surnames
Patronymic surnames